Plamondon may refer to:

People with the surname
 Antoine Plamondon (–1895), Canadian artist
 Bob Plamondon (born 1957), Canadian portrait painter
 Charles Plamondon (born 1961), Canadian biathlete
 Crystal Plamondon (born 1963), Canadian country music singer
 Gerry Plamondon (1924–2019), Canadian ice hockey player
 Huguette Plamondon (1926–2010), Canadian trade unionist
 Louis Plamondon (born 1943), Canadian politician
 Louis Plamondon (lawyer) (1785–1828), lawyer and militia officer in Lower Canada
 Luc Plamondon (born 1942), Canadian musician
 Madeleine Plamondon (born 1931), Canadian senator and consumer advocate
 Marc-Aurèle Plamondon (1823–1900), Canadian judge
 Marius Plamondon (1914–1976), Canadian sculptor and stained glass artist
 Pascal Plamondon (born 1992), Canadian weightlifter
 Pun Plamondon, American activist

Places
 Plamondon, Alberta, a hamlet in northern Alberta, Canada
 Plamondon Bay, a body of water in the western part of the Gouin Reservoir in La Tuque, Quebec, Canada
 Plamondon Creek, a tributary of the Gouin Reservoir in La Tuque, Quebec, Canada
 Plamondon River, a tributary of the Harricana River, mostly in Eeyou Istchee Baie-James, Quebec, Canada
 Plamondon station, of the Montreal Metro